

me

mea-meb
Measurin
mebanazine (INN)
Mebendazole
mebendazole (INN)
mebenoside (INN)
mebeverine (INN)
mebezonium iodide (INN)
mebhydrolin (INN)
mebiquine (INN)
mebolazine (INN)
mebrofenin (INN)
mebutamate (INN)
mebutizide (INN)

mec
mecamylamine (INN)
mecarbinate (INN)
mecasermin (INN)
mecetronium etilsulfate (INN)
meciadanol (INN)
mecillinam (INN)
mecinarone (INN)
Meclan
meclocycline (INN)
Meclodium
meclofenamic acid (INN)
meclofenoxate (INN)
Meclomen
meclonazepam (INN)
mecloqualone (INN)
mecloralurea (INN)
meclorisone (INN)
mecloxamine (INN)
meclozine (INN)
mecobalamin (INN)
mecrilate (INN)
mecysteine (INN)

med
medazepam (INN)
medazomide (INN)
medetomidine (INN)
medibazine (INN)
medifoxamine (INN)
Medigesic Plus
Medihaler Ergotamine
Medihaler-Epi
Medihaler-Iso
Medipren
medorinone (INN)
medorubicin (INN)
medrogestone (INN)
Medrol
medronic acid (INN)
medroxalol (INN)
Medroxyhexal (Hexal Australia) [Au]. Redirects to medroxyprogesterone.
medroxyprogesterone (INN)
medrylamine (INN)
medrysone (INN)

mef-meg
mefeclorazine (INN)
mefenamic acid (INN)
mefenidil (INN)
mefenidramium metilsulfate (INN)
mefenorex (INN)
mefeserpine (INN)
mefexamide (INN)
mefloquine (INN)
Mefoxin (Merck)
mefruside (INN)
Megace (Bristol-Myers Squibb)
megalomicin (INN)
Megatope (Iso-Tex Diagnostics)
megestrol (INN)
meglitinide (INN)
meglucycline (INN)
meglumine (INN)
meglutol (INN)

mel-mem
meladrazine (INN)
melagatran (INN)
melarsomine (INN)
melarsonyl potassium (INN)
melarsoprol (INN)
melengestrol (INN)
meletimide (INN)
Melfiat
melinamide (INN)
melitracen (INN)
melizame (INN)
Mellaril
meloxicam (INN)
melperone (INN)
melphalan (INN)
melquinast (INN)
meluadrine (INN)
memantine (INN)
memotine (INN)

men-meo
menabitan (INN)
menadiol sodium sulfate (INN)
menadione sodium bisulfite (INN)
menatetrenone (INN)
menbutone (INN)
Menest (Monarch Pharmaceuticals)
menfegol (INN)
menglytate (INN)
menitrazepam (INN)
menoctone (INN)
menogaril (INN)
Menostar (Bayer)
Menrium (Roche)
Mentax (Mylan)
meobentine (INN)